Choreutis basalis is a species of moth of the family Choreutidae. It is found in eastern Queensland, from Cape York to Yeppoon. It is also present in New Guinea and Indonesia.

Adults have dark brown wings. Each fore wing has a yellow bar across it. The hind wings each have a yellow patch.

Larvae feed on the foliage of Ficus species.

References

External links
Australian Faunal Directory
Image at choreutidae.lifedesks.org

Choreutis
Moths of Australia
Moths of Indonesia
Moths of New Guinea
Moths described in 1875